Phnom Penh is the capital and most populous city of Cambodia. It has been the national capital since the French protectorate of Cambodia and has grown to become the nation's primate city and its economic, industrial, and cultural centre.

Phnom Penh succeeded Angkor Thom as the capital of the Khmer nation but was abandoned several times before being reestablished in 1865 by King Norodom. The city formerly functioned as a processing center, with textiles, pharmaceuticals, machine manufacturing, and rice milling. Its chief assets, however, were cultural. Institutions of higher learning included the Royal University of Phnom Penh (established in 1960 as Royal Khmer University), with schools of engineering, fine arts, technology, and agricultural sciences, the latter at Chamkar Daung, a suburb. Also located in Phnom Penh were the Royal University of Agronomic Sciences and the Agricultural School of Prek Leap.

The city was nicknamed the "Pearl of Asia" for its early 20th century colonial French architecture, which included Art Deco works. Phnom Penh, along with Siem Reap and Sihanoukville, are significant global and domestic tourist destinations for Cambodia. Founded in 1372, the city is noted for its historical architecture and attractions. It became the national capital in 1434 following the fall of Angkor, and remained so until 1497. It regained its capital status during the French colonial era in 1865. There are a number of surviving colonial-era buildings scattered along the grand boulevards.

On the banks of the Tonlé Sap, Mekong, and Bassac Rivers, Phnom Penh is home to more than 2 million people, approximately 14% of the Cambodian population. The Greater Phnom Penh area includes the nearby Ta Khmau city and some districts of Kandal province.

Etymology
Phnom Penh (lit. 'Penh's Hill') takes its name from the present Wat Phnom (lit. 'Hill Temple') or from the former Funan Kingdom, an ancient kingdom that existed from 1st to 7th century AD in Southeast Asia and  the forerunner of the current Cambodian monarchy. Legend has it that in 1372, a wealthy widow named Penh found a Koki tree floating down the Tonlé Sap river after a storm. Inside the tree were four bronze Buddha statues and a stone statue of Vishnu. Penh ordered villagers to raise the height of the hill northeast of her house and used the Koki wood to build a temple on the hill to house the four Buddha statues, and a shrine for the Vishnu image slightly lower down. The temple became known as Wat Phnom Daun Penh, which is now known as Wat Phnom, a small hill  in height.

Phnom Penh's former official name is Krong Chaktomuk Serei Mongkol (lit. 'City of the Brahma's Faces'), in its short form as Krong Chaktomuk (lit. "City of Four Faces"). Krong Chaktomuk is an abbreviation of the full name which was given by King Ponhea Yat, Krong Chaktomuk Mongkol Sakal Kampuchea Thipadei Serei Theakreak Bavar Intabat Borei Roat Reach Seima Moha Nokor. This loosely translates as "The place of four rivers that gives the happiness and success of Khmer Kingdom, the highest leader as well as impregnable city of the God Indra of the great kingdom".

History
The initial settlement of Phnom Penh is believed to have been established since the 5th century AD, according to the discovery of ancient kiln site in Choeung Ek commune of Dangkao district, southern part of central Phnom Penh in the early 2000s. Choeung Ek archaeological site was one of the  largest kiln pottery center in Cambodia and the earliest known kiln sites in Southeast Asia to produce the ceremonial vessels known as kendi from 5th to 13th century. Archaeologist stated that a large community is surrounded by a circular earthwork structure that is 740 metres in diameter and 4 metres high, built in the 11th century. In addition, there are remnants of other ancient village infrastructure, irrigation system, inscription, Shiva linga as well as an ancient brick temple foundation and its ornate remains which dated back to Funan era.

First recorded a century after it is said to have taken place, the legend of the founding of Phnom Penh tells of a local woman, Penh (commonly referred to as Daun Penh (Lady Penh in Khmer), living at Chaktomuk, the future Phnom Penh. It was the late 14th century, and the Khmer capital was still at Angkor near Siem Reap  to the north. Gathering firewood along the banks of the river, Lady Penh spied a floating koki tree in the river and fished it from the water. Inside the tree she found four Buddha statues and one of Vishnu.

The discovery was taken as a divine blessing, and to some a sign that the Khmer capital was to be brought to Phnom Penh from Angkor. To house the new-found sacred objects, Penh raised a small hill on the west bank of the Tonle Sap River and crowned it with a shrine, now known as Wat Phnom at the north end of central Phnom Penh. "Phnom" is Khmer for "hill" and Penh's hill took on the name of the founder, and the area around it became known after the hill.

Phnom Penh first became the capital of Cambodia after Ponhea Yat, king of the Khmer Empire, moved the capital from Angkor Thom after it was captured and destroyed by Siam a few years earlier. There is a stupa behind Wat Phnom that houses the remains of Ponhea Yat and the royal family as well as the remaining Buddhist statues from the Angkorean era. In the 17th century, Japanese immigrants also settled on the outskirts of present-day Phnom Penh. A small Portuguese community survived in Phnom Penh until the 17th century, undertaking commercial and religious activity in the country.

Phnom Penh remained the royal capital for 73 years, from 1432 to 1505. It was abandoned for 360 years (from 1505 to 1865) by subsequent kings due to internal fighting between the royal pretenders. Later kings moved the capital several times and established their royal capitals at various locations in Tuol Basan (Srey Santhor), Pursat, Longvek, Lavear Em and Oudong.

It was not until 1866, under the reign of King Norodom I (1860–1904), the eldest son of King Ang Duong, who ruled on behalf of Siam, that Phnom Penh became the permanent seat of government and capital of Cambodia, and also where the current Royal Palace was built. Beginning in 1870, the French colonial authorities turned a riverside village into a city where they built hotels, schools, prisons, barracks, banks, public works offices, telegraph offices, law courts, and health services buildings. In 1872, the first glimpse of a modern city took shape when the colonial administration employed the services of French contractor Le Faucheur to construct the first 300 concrete houses for sale and rental to Chinese traders.

By the 1920s, Phnom Penh was known as the "Pearl of Asia", and over the next four decades, Phnom Penh continued to experience rapid growth with the building of railways to Sihanoukville and Pochentong International Airport (now Phnom Penh International Airport). Phnom Penh's infrastructure saw major modernisation under the rule of Sihanouk.

During the Vietnam War, Cambodia was used as a base by the People's Army of Vietnam and the Viet Cong, and thousands of refugees from across the country flooded the city to escape the fighting between their own government troops, the People's Army of Vietnam, the Viet Cong, the South Vietnamese and their allies, the Khmer Rouge, and American air strikes. By 1975, the population was 2–3 million, the bulk of whom were refugees from the fighting. The Khmer Rouge cut off supplies to the city for more than a year before it fell on April 17, 1975. Reports from journalists stated that the Khmer Rouge shelling "tortured the capital almost continuously", inflicting "random death and mutilation" on millions of trapped civilians. The Khmer Rouge forcibly evacuated the entire city after taking it, in what has been described as a death march: François Ponchaud wrote that "I shall never forget one cripple who had neither hands nor feet, writhing along the ground like a severed worm, or a weeping father carrying his ten-year old daughter wrapped in a sheet tied around his neck like a sling, or the man with his foot dangling at the end of a leg to which it was attached by nothing but skin"; Jon Swain recalled that the Khmer Rouge were "tipping out patients from the hospitals like garbage into the streets....In five years of war, this is the greatest caravan of human misery I have seen". All of its residents, including the wealthy and educated, were evacuated from the city and forced to do difficult labour on rural farms as "new people". Tuol Sleng High School was taken over by Pol Pot's forces and was turned into the S-21 prison camp, where people were detained and tortured. Pol Pot sought a return to an agrarian economy and therefore killed many people perceived as educated, "lazy", spies, or political enemies. Many others starved to death as a result of failure of the agrarian society and the sale of Cambodia's rice to China in exchange for bullets and weaponry. The former high school is now the Tuol Sleng Genocide Museum, where Khmer Rouge torture devices and photos of their victims are displayed.

The Khmer Rouge were driven out of Phnom Penh by the People's Army of Vietnam in 1979, and people began to return to the city. Vietnam is historically a state with which Cambodia has had many conflicts, therefore this liberation was and is viewed with mixed emotions by the Cambodians. A period of reconstruction began, spurred by the continuing stability of government, attracting new foreign investment and aid by countries including France, Australia, and Japan. Loans were made from the Asian Development Bank and the World Bank to reinstate a clean water supply, roads and other infrastructure. The 1998 Census put Phnom Penh's population at 862,000; and the 2008 census was 1.3 million. By 2019, its population reached over 2.2 million, based on general population census.

Geography

Phnom Penh is in the south-central region of Cambodia, and is fully surrounded by the Kandal province. The municipality is on the banks of the Tonlé Sap, Mekong, and Bassac Rivers. These rivers provide freshwater and other natural resources to the city. Phnom Penh and the surrounding areas consist of a typical flood plain area for Cambodia.

Climate
Phnom Penh has a tropical wet and dry climate (Köppen climate classification Aw). The climate is hot year-round with only minor variations. The southwest monsoon blows inland bringing moisture-laden winds from the Gulf of Thailand and Indian Ocean from May to November. The northeast monsoon ushers in the dry season, which lasts from December to April. The city experiences the heaviest precipitation from September to October with the driest period in January and February.

The city has two distinct seasons. The rainy season, which runs from May to November, sees high temperatures accompanied by high humidity.

Administration

Phnom Penh is an autonomous municipality of area  with a government status equal to that of the provinces. The autonomous municipality is subdivided into 14 administrative divisions called khans (sections). The district s are subdivided into 105 sangkats (quarters), and further subdivided into 953 phums (villages).  All khans are under the governance of Phnom Penh. Dangkao, Meanchey, Porsenchey, Sen Sok and Russey Keo are considered the outskirts of the city.

Phnom Penh is governed by the governor who acts as the top executive of the city as well as overseeing the Municipal Military Police, Municipal Police, and Bureau of Urban Affairs. Below the governor is the first vice governor and five vice governors. The chief of cabinet, who holds the same status as the vice governors, heads the cabinet consisting of eight deputy chiefs of cabinet who in turn are in charge of the 27 administrative departments. Every khans also has a chief.

Demographics

, Phnom Penh had a population of 2,129,371 people, with a total population density of 3,136 inhabitants per square kilometre in a  city area. The population growth rate of the city is 3.92%. The city area has grown fourfold since 1979, and the metro area will continue to expand in order to support the city's growing population and economy.

A survey by the National Institute of Statistics in 2017 showed that 95.3% of the population in Phnom Penh are Khmer, 4% Chams, and 0.7% others, predominantly Chinese, Vietnamese, and other small ethnic groups who are Thai, Budong, Mnong Preh, Kuy and Chong.

The official language is Khmer, but English and French are widely used in the city.

The number of slum-inhabitants at the end of 2012 was 105,771, compared with 85,807 at the start of 2012.

Note: As stated in the "History" paragraph (The 1998 Census put Phnom Penh's population at 862,000; and the 2008 census was 1.3 million.) the information collides with the information provided in the "Historical population" table. Needs editing.

Religion

The state religion is Theravada Buddhism. More than 97.8% of the people in Phnom Penh are Buddhists. Chams have been practicing Islam for hundreds of years. Small percentage follow Christianity.

Politics

 
Phnom Penh is allocated 12 seats in the National Assembly, making it the largest constituency.

Members of Parliament

Economy

Phnom Penh is Cambodia's economic centre as it accounts for a large portion of the Cambodian economy. Double-digit economic growth rates in recent years have triggered an economic boom in Phnom Penh, with new hotels, restaurants, schools, bars, high rises and residential buildings springing up in the city.

The economy is based on commercial interests such as garments, trading, and small and medium enterprises. In the past few years the property business has been booming, with rapidly increasing real estate prices. Tourism is also a major contributor in the capital as more shopping and commercial centres open, making Phnom Penh one of the major tourist destinations in South East Asia along with Siem Reap and Sihanoukville. According to the World Travel and Tourism Council, tourism made up 19.2 percent (US$2,053 million) of Cambodia's GDP in 2009 and accounts for 13.7 percent of total employment. One of the most popular areas in Phnom Penh for tourists is Sisowath Quay, alongside the Tonle Sap River. Sisowath Quay is a five kilometre strip of road that includes restaurants, bars, and hotels.

The  billion new urban development, Camko City, is meant to bolster the city landscape. The Bureau of Urban Affairs of Phnom Penh Municipality has plans to expand and construct new infrastructure to accommodate the growing population and economy. High rise buildings will be constructed at the entrance of the city and near the lakes and riverbanks. Furthermore, new roads, canals, and a railway system will be used to connect Camko City and Phnom Penh.

Other projects include:
 Grand Phnom Penh International City (under construction)
 De Castle Royal Condominium (Completed)
 Gold Tower 42 (On hold 32 floors construction begins again in the mid of 2018)
 OCIC Tower (Completed)
 Kokling super second floor house
 Vattanac Capital Tower (completed)
 The Bridge (Completed)
 The Peak (Completed)

With booming economic growth seen since the 1990s, new shopping venues have opened, such as Sorya Center Point, Aeon Mall Phnom Penh, Aeon Mall Sen Sok City and Olympia Mall. Many international brands have opened such as Mango, Salvatore Ferragamo, Hugo Boss, Padini Concept Store, Lily, Timberland, Jimmy Choo, CC Double O, MO, Brands Outlet, Nike, Converse, Pony, Armani Exchange, and Super Dry.

The tower was completed in December 2014. Modern high rises have been constructed all around the city, not concentrated in any one particular area.

The Central Market Phsar Thmei is a tourist attraction. The four wings of the yellow colored market are teeming with numerous stalls selling gold and silver jewelry, antique coins, clothing, clocks, flowers, food, fabrics and shoes. Phsar Thmei is undergoing under a major renovation, along with the creation of newer stalls.

Education

Universities and colleges

 
 
 Norton University

Primary and secondary schools

International schools

Supplementary and extra schools

The Japanese Supplementary School of Phnom Penh, formerly known in English as the Phnom Penh Japanese School, is a part-time Japanese School, operated by the Japanese Association of Cambodia (JACAM;カンボジア日本人会 Kambojia Nihonjin-kai). It is in Sangkat Toek Thla in Sen Sok. It was established in 2002. It had 60 students in June 2011.

Culture

Phnom Penh also has its own dialect of Khmer. Speakers of the Phnom Penh dialect often elide syllables, which has earned it a reputation for being lazy speech. Phnom Penh is also known for its influence on New Khmer Architecture. Phnom Penh is notable for Ka tieu Phnom Penh, its variation on rice noodle soup, a dish available in sit-down cafes as well as street cafes.

The city hosts a number of music events throughout the city. Indie bands have grown in number due also in part to the emergence of private music schools such as SoundsKool Music (also operating in the city of Siem Reap), and Music Arts School (registered as a non-governmental organization). The Cambodian fishing dance originated in Phnom Penh at the Royal University of Fine Arts in the 1960s.

The two most visited museums in the city are the National Museum, which is the country's leading historical and archaeological museum, and Tuol Sleng Genocide Museum, a former Khmer Rouge prison. The National Museum hosts celebrations of Cambodian dance and music, including a popular classic Apsara dance show of traditional folk dances as well as original creations.

Cambodian New Year 

At this time, Phnom Penh celebrates Cambodian New Year, an occasion increasingly popular with tourists. During this typically hottest part of the year, water gets thrown around adding to the party atmosphere along with dancing and music. The precise date changes year-by-year but this holiday lasts, at least, three days. This festival marks the turn of the year based on the ancient Khmer calendar and also marks the end of the prior year harvest.

Water Festival 

The largest annual festival in Phnom Penh, this lively gathering celebrates the reversing of the flow of the Tonlé Sap River. The holiday lasts three days as people flood into the city to enjoy the fireworks, boat races, live concerts, eating and partying. The boat racing dates back to ancient times marking the strengths of the Khmer marine forces during the Khmer Empire.

On November 22, 2010, at least 348 people were crushed to death in a bridge stampede at the festival.

Ancestors' Day 

Ancestors' Day, also called Pchum Ben, is a very important aspect of Cambodian culture. It may be translated as "gathering together" to make offerings and is a time of reunion, commemoration, express love and appreciation for one's ancestors. By offering food and good karma to those possibly trapped in the spirit world, living relatives help assuage their misery and guide them back into the cycle of reincarnation.

Visak Bochea 

Vesākha is an annual holiday observed traditionally by Buddhists in Cambodia. Sometimes informally called "Buddha's Birthday", it actually encompasses the birth, enlightenment (nirvāṇa), and passing away (Parinirvāna) of Gautama Buddha.

Cityscape and architecture

The oldest structure is Wat Phnom from the founding days of the city, constructed in 1373. The main tourist attractions are the Royal Palace with the Silver Pagoda, and the National Museum, constructed during the French colonial era in the late-19th century in the classical Khmer style and hosting a vast collection of Khmer antiquities. The Independence Monument (Khmer: Vimean Akareach), although from the 1950s, is also constructed in the ancient Khmer style.

The French, who were the colonial masters from the 19th century to the 1940s, also left their mark, with various colonial villas, French churches, boulevards, and the Art Deco market Phsar Thom Thmei. A notable landmark of the colonial era is the Hotel Le Royal.

Starting with independence from the French in the 1950s and lasting until the era of the Khmer Rouge in the 1970s, Phnom Penh underwent tremendous growth as the capital city of a newly independent country. King Sihanouk was eager to present a new style of architecture and thus invigorate the process of nation building. A new golden era of architecture took off, with various projects and young Khmer architects, often educated in France, given opportunities to design and construct. This new movement was called "New Khmer Architecture" and was often characterised by a fusion of Bauhaus, European post-modern architecture, and traditional elements from Angkor. The most prominent architect was Vann Molyvann, who was nominated chief national architect by the king himself in 1956. Molyvann created landmark buildings such as the Preah Suramarit National Theatre or the Vann Molyvann House. Other architects helped construct the newly founded Royal Khmer University, the Institute of Foreign Languages, and the National Sports Centre. With the growth of the upper and entrepreneurial middle classes, new suburbs were built in the 1950s and 1960s. Although these buildings survived the Khmer Rouge era and the civil war, today they are under threat due to economic development and financial speculation. Villas and gardens from that era are being destroyed and redeveloped to make place for bigger structures. The landmark National Theatre by Molyvann was razed in 2008. A movement is rising in Cambodia to preserve this modernist heritage. Old villas are sometimes being converted into boutique hotels, such as the Knai Bang Chatt.

Monuments and memorials to the genocide of the Khmer Rouge era in the 1970s are the Tuol Sleng Genocide Museum (a former high school used as a concentration camp) and, on the outskirts of the city, the Choeung Ek Genocide Center. The Cambodia-Vietnam Friendship Monument was commissioned by the Vietnamese communists as symbol of Khmer-Vietnamese friendship during the late-1970s following the liberation of Cambodia from the Khmer Rouge.

The population, foreign investment, and urban development in Phnom Penh grew dramatically during the 1990s and early-2000s. The rapid growth resulted in the city's infrastructure distinctly lacking (the drainage system is particularly notorious, and Phnom Penh frequently floods during the wet season), and a need for both residential and commercial spaces. The simultaneous demand for residential and commercial housing and the increase of international investment has led to the planning, if not construction, of several satellite cities. The largest of these cities are: Grand Phnom Penh International City, CamKo City, Diamond Island City, Boeung Kak Town, and Chruy Cangva City.

On the outskirts of the city, farmland has been developed into garment factories and housing for lower economic classes and those displaced by the new development in the city center.

2035 master plan 
Originally intended to be completed by 2020, the 2035 master plan is a French-funded project for the development of Phnom Penh. Although the plan was approved by the Ministry of Land Management, Urban Planning and Construction in 2005, it has yet to be ratified by the Cabinet of Cambodia. The original plan details five edge-city projects connected to the historical city centre by waterways and tree-lined corridors.

Media

Dailies

Khmer
Sralagn' Khmer (Love Khmer)
Chakraval Daily (Universe)
Kampuchea Thmei Daily (New Cambodia)
Kampuchea Tgnai Nis (Cambodia Today)
Kanychok Sangkhum (Social Reflection)
Koh Santepheap (Island of Peace)
Moneaksekar Khmer (Khmer Conscience) – Published by the Sam Rainsy Party.
Rasmei Kampuchea (Light of Kampuchea) – Cambodia's largest daily, it circulates about 18,000 copies.
Samleng Yuvachun (Voice of Khmer Youth)
Udomkate Khmer (Khmer Ideal)
Wat Phnom Daily (Mount Temple)

English
Phnom Penh Post, a daily English-language newspaper published in Phnom Penh.
The Cambodia Daily, an English-language daily newspaper (closed in 2017).
The Khmer Times, an English-language daily newspaper.

Chinese
《柬華日報》(Jianhua Daily), a daily Chinese-language newspaper published in Phnom Penh.
《星洲日報》(Sin Chew Daily), a Chinese-language daily newspaper, the Cambodian edition of the Malaysian Chinese daily of the same name.
《華商日報》(Huashang Daily), a Chinese-language daily newspaper.
《高棉日报》(Khmer Daily), a Chinese-language daily newspaper.
《新柬埔寨》(New Cambodia), a Chinese-language daily newspaper.

Magazines
AsiaLIFE Guide Phnom Penh, a monthly English-language lifestyle magazine published in Phnom Penh. (Ceased in 2018)
 F Magazine, the first fashion-forward magazine in Cambodia. Bi-lingual, written in English and Khmer.
 SOVRIN Magazine, is the fashion glossy magazine in Cambodia which written in khmer language.

Online news
Thmey Thmey Phnom Penh
Sabay News Phnom Penh.
Fresh News Phnom Penh

Sport

The martial arts of Bokator, Pradal Serey (Khmer kick boxing) and Khmer traditional wrestling have venues in Phnom Penh watched by dedicated spectators. Cambodia has increasingly become involved in modern sports over the last 30 years. As with the rest of the country, football and the martial arts are particularly popular.  Ultimate fighting and freestyle boxing have also become more common in recent years.

The most prominent sporting venue in the city is the Phnom Penh National Olympic Stadium with a capacity of 50,000—although the country never hosted the Olympic Games due to disruption by the civil war and the Khmer Rouge in the 1970s. Built in 1964, it is home to the Cambodian national football team. On completion the stadium was one of the largest in Asia. Volleyball, basketball, and Tai-Kwon-Do games are often hosted at the stadium.  The stadium closed in 2000, but was redeveloped and reopened.

In footballing ventures, Phnom Penh is formally represented by Phnom Penh Crown FC despite being home to numerous football teams who plays in the Cambodian League. Including Visakha, Nagaworld, Boeungket and the aforementioned Phnom Penh Crown, amongst many others.

The National Sports Centre of Cambodia hosts swimming, boxing, and volleyball competitions. Noted local football clubs include Phnom Penh Empire, Khemara Keila FC and Military Police. The city will host the 2023 Southeast Asian Games and the 2023 ASEAN Para Games, this will mark the first time that Cambodia has hosted a multi-sport event.

Transport

Phnom Penh International Airport is the largest and busiest airport in Cambodia. It is seven kilometres west of central Phnom Penh. The airport is connected to the city center by taxi, train, and shuttle bus.

Cambodia's national flag carrier, Cambodia Angkor Air, launched in 2009, is headquartered in Phnom Penh and has its main hub there, with an additional hub at the Angkor International Airport.

Air France used to serve Phnom Penh from Paris-Charles de Gaulle but this service has since stopped. Qatar Airways now flies to and from Phnom Penh, via Ho Chi Minh City.

Taxis, pick-ups, and minibuses leave the city for destinations all over the country, but are fast losing ground to cheaper and more comfortable buses. Phnom Penh also has a rail service.

There are numerous bus companies, including Phnom Penh Public Transport and GST Express, running services to most provincial capitals, including Sihanoukville, Kampong Chhnang, Oudong and Takéo. Phnom Penh Sorya Transport Co. offers bus service to several provincial destinations along the National Routes and to Ho Chi Minh City. Giant Ibis is another bus company based in Phnom Penh, which travels to Sihanoukville, Kampot, Siem Reap and Ho Chi Minh, and has free Wi-Fi, air conditioning and modest pricing.

The city is Cambodia's main freshwater port, a major port on the Mekong River. It is linked to the South China Sea, 290 kilometres distant, via a channel of the Mekong in Vietnam.

Public transport

Phnom Penh is served by air conditioned public buses. Initial attempts by the Japanese government to develop a Phnom Penh bus service began in 2001. An update of the JICA urban transport master plan for Phnom Penh was completed and implemented in 2014. The city is now served by 17 bus lines, operated by the Phnom Penh municipal government. Private transportation within the city include the cycle rickshaw, known in Khmer as "cyclo", the motorcycle taxi known in Khmer as "moto", the auto rickshaw known locally as "tuk-tuk", the trailer attached to a motorcycle taxi known in Khmer as "remorque", and the standard automobile taxicab known in Khmer as "taxi". Private forms of transportation used by locals include bicycles, motorbikes, and cars.

Highways

As the capital of Cambodia, a number of national highways connect the city with various parts of the country:

Water supply

Water supply in Phnom Penh has improved dramatically in terms of access, service quality, efficiency, cost recovery and governance between 1993 and 2006. The number of customers has increased ninefold, service quality has improved from intermittent to continuous supply, water losses have been cut dramatically and the city's water utility went from being bankrupt to making a modest profit. These achievements were recognized through international awards such as the 2006 Ramon Magsaysay Award and the 2010 Stockholm Industry Water Award. The city's water utility is the Phnom Penh Water Supply Authority (PPWSA). Its main water sources are the Mekong River, the Tonle Sap river and the Tonle Bassac river.

Twin towns – sister cities
Phnom Penh is twinned with:

Bangkok, Thailand
Beijing, China
Busan, South Korea
Chongqing, China
Hanoi, Vietnam
Hefei, China
Ho Chi Minh City, Vietnam
Incheon, South Korea
Kitakyushu, Japan
Kunming, China
Long Beach, United States
Lowell, United States
Shanghai, China
Shenzhen, China

Notable people
 
 
George Groslier, French polymath, historian, archaeologist
Norodom Sihamoni, King of Cambodia
Patricia Hy-Boulais, professional tennis player
Preap Sovath, Cambodian singer
Theavy Mok (born 1963), first plastic surgeon in Cambodia

See also
 List of markets in Phnom Penh
 Special Economic Zones of Cambodia

References

Bibliography

External links

 Official city website
Time in Phnom Penh

 
Municipalities of Cambodia
Provinces of Cambodia
Populated places on the Mekong River
Capitals in Asia
Populated places established in the 1370s
Cities in Cambodia
14th-century establishments in Asia
States and territories established in 1372